Thomas Azier (born in Leiderdorp, Netherlands, on 14 August 1987) is a Dutch avant-pop singer and musician.

Azier studied at the Academie voor Popcultuur in Leeuwarden in 2005. At age 19, he moved to Berlin, Germany, where he performed in various night venues. In 2012, he won the Friesland Pop Talent Award and released two EPs, Hylas 001 and Hylas 002 on his own Hylas Records label which led to a deal with Universal Music France (Island France / Mercury Music Group).

Debut album Hylas 
In 2014, he had his first studio album Hylas released, the result of five years of work. It has charted in the Netherlands, France and Belgium. The album became Album of the Week at VPRO's 3VOOR12 in Holland and the single Red Eyes became Single of the Week at iTunes. Another single from the album - Ghostcicty - was featured in the series Lucifer.

Azier also co-wrote and played on several songs on the album Racine carrée by the Belgian singer Stromae and as a solo artist he provided the support acts during his tour and tours of Woodkid.

Rouge, Stray & Raven On The First Floor 
In 2017, Azier released his second studio album Rouge, which featured the successful radio singles Talk To Me and Gold.

The music on the album Stray, 2018, was composed and produced fully on the move, a travel that took him from Kyoto to Abidjan, Paris, New York, Berlin and back to the Netherlands. The tension of constant travel resulted in the fact that the entire album was recorded and created on his laptop with a USB microphone in several hotels and short term rental flats. Stray was released independently on Azier's label Hylas Records. The song Vertigo was released as a single. Echoes, White Horses and Hymn became live favourites.

In 2019, Thomas produced two singles by Dutch rock singer Anouk, which he also co-wrote: It's A New Day and Million Dollar.

The EP Raven On The First Floor was released in May 2019, featuring the singles Map Of Your Loneliness and Strangling Song. On the EP Thomas collaborated with the German multi-instrumentalist Obi Blanch for the first time.

Love, Disorderly, A Collection Of Broken Ideas & The Inventory Of Our Desire 
The album Love, Disorderly was released on Hylas Records on 12 June 2020. Preceded by the short films Love, Disorderly, Entertainment and Hold On Tight. Thomas' version of Gala' 1997 hit Freed From Desire was featured on the album as well. 

In 2021 - during the pandemic - the meditative A Collection Of Broken Ideas was released, a more 40-minute, largely instrumental piece, divided into Side A and Side B. About the piece Thomas wrote on his Facebook page: "Recorded at my home studio over the past year, these compositions kept me company when making music with others was impossible. I searched for space in my music and these ideas gave me hope. Now I hope it can do the same for you".

During his club tour in October 2022, Azier announced a new album to be released in February 2023. Preceded by the singles Faces, Blister & Skin, Pelechian & What Does It Mean To Be Free.

The Inventory Of Our Desire was released on February 10, accompanied by the single Invisible.

Discography

Albums

EPs
Hylas 001 (2012)
Hylas 002 (2013)
Live At Studio Davout, Paris (2017)S t r a y (2018)Raven On The First Floor (2019)Too Much Entertainment (Remixes) (2020)
A Collection Of Broken Ideas (2021)

Singles

Videography
Angelene - Directed by Sander Houtkruijer 
Ghostcity - Directed by Sander Houtkruijer 
Verwandlung - Directed by Sander Houtkruijer 
Love, Disorderly - Directed by Laurent Chanez 
Winners - Directed by Ellen Treasure
Entertainment - Directed by Nils Edström

References

Official website
Newsarticle Nu.nl
Interview 3voor12
Interview The Daily Indie 
Interview The Daily Indie

External links
Official website

Dutch male songwriters
1987 births
Living people
People from Leiderdorp
21st-century Dutch male singers
21st-century Dutch singers